Willi Herrmann (1893–1968) was a German art director.

Selected filmography

 Madness (1919)
 Child on the Open Road (1919)
 Jettatore (1919)
 Humanity Unleashed (1920)
 The Secrets of Berlin (1921)
 The Maharaja's Victory (1923)
 The Third Watch (1924)
 Ship in Distress (1925)
 The King and the Girl (1925)
 The Man on the Comet (1925)
 The Fire Dancer (1925)
 Nick, King of the Chauffeurs (1925)
 Frisian Blood (1925)
 People in Need (1925)
 Eyes Open, Harry! (1926)
 The Good Reputation (1926)
 German Hearts on the German Rhine (1926)
 Bismarck 1862–1898 (1927)
 The Lorelei (1927)
 On the Banks of the River Weser (1927)
 Night of Mystery (1927)
 The Merry Farmer (1927)
 Circus Renz (1927)
 The Last Performance of the Circus Wolfson (1928)
 Give Me Life (1928)
 The King of Carnival (1928)
 The Beloved of His Highness (1928)
 Song (1928)
 Tales from the Vienna Woods (1928)
 Tragedy at the Royal Circus (1928)
 His Strongest Weapon (1928)
 The League of Three (1929)
 The Tsarevich (1929)
 High Treason (1929)
 The Flame of Love (1930)
 The Citadel of Warsaw (1930)
 Flachsmann the Educator (1930)
 Susanne Cleans Up (1930)
 The Blonde Nightingale (1930)
 The Tiger Murder Case (1930)
 Express 13 (1931)
 A Crafty Youth (1931)
 Ash Wednesday (1931)
 You Will Be My Wife (1932)
 At Your Orders, Sergeant (1932)
 Spoiling the Game (1932)
 Ship Without a Harbour (1932)
 Crime Reporter Holm (1932)
 The Invisible Front (1932)
 Two Heavenly Blue Eyes (1932)
 Girls of Today (1933)
 The Sandwich Girl (1933)
 Gretel Wins First Prize (1933)
 Jumping Into the Abyss (1933)
 The World Without a Mask (1934)
 Holiday From Myself (1934)
 Last Stop (1935)
 Moscow-Shanghai (1936)
 The Czar's Courier (1936)
 Talking About Jacqueline (1937)
 Alarm in Peking (1937)
 Central Rio (1939)
 Escape in the Dark (1939)
 Men Are That Way (1939)
 Front Theatre (1942)
 The Trip to Marrakesh (1949)
 Don't Play with Love (1949)
 Martina (1949)
 Girls Behind Bars (1949)
 Scandal at the Embassy (1950)
 When Men Cheat (1950)
 The Dubarry (1951)
 Rose of the Mountain (1952)
 Mikosch Comes In (1952)
 Klettermaxe (1952)
 When The Village Music Plays on Sunday Nights (1953)
 Hooray, It's a Boy! (1953)
 The Seven Dresses of Katrin (1954)
 On the Reeperbahn at Half Past Midnight (1954)
 The Beautiful Miller (1954)
 The Faithful Hussar (1954)
 The Country Schoolmaster (1954)
 Love is Forever (1954)
 Emil and the Detectives (1954)
 The Gypsy Baron (1954)
 Son Without a Home (1955)
 The Ambassador's Wife (1955)
 Your Life Guards (1955)
 Sergeant Borck (1955)
 The Tour Guide of Lisbon (1956)
 My Brother Joshua (1956)
 As Long as the Roses Bloom (1956)
 All Roads Lead Home (1957)
 Greetings and Kisses from Tegernsee (1957)
 Paradise for Sailors (1959)
 Every Day Isn't Sunday (1959)
 The Avenger (1960)
 Three Men in a Boat (1961)

References

Bibliography

External links

1893 births
1968 deaths
German art directors
Film people from Berlin